Luis Fernando García Bechinie (born September 13, 1974 in Amatitlán) is a male race walker from Guatemala. He competed for his native country in four consecutive Summer Olympics, starting in 1996 (Atlanta, Georgia).

Achievements

References
 
 

1974 births
Living people
Guatemalan male racewalkers
Athletes (track and field) at the 1999 Pan American Games
Athletes (track and field) at the 2003 Pan American Games
Athletes (track and field) at the 2007 Pan American Games
Athletes (track and field) at the 1996 Summer Olympics
Athletes (track and field) at the 2000 Summer Olympics
Athletes (track and field) at the 2004 Summer Olympics
Athletes (track and field) at the 2008 Summer Olympics
Olympic athletes of Guatemala
Pan American Games bronze medalists for Guatemala
Pan American Games medalists in athletics (track and field)
Central American and Caribbean Games silver medalists for Guatemala
Central American Games gold medalists for Guatemala
Central American Games medalists in athletics
Competitors at the 2002 Central American and Caribbean Games
Competitors at the 2006 Central American and Caribbean Games
Central American and Caribbean Games medalists in athletics
Medalists at the 2003 Pan American Games
20th-century Guatemalan people
21st-century Guatemalan people